Chernomorsky (masculine), Chernomorskaya (feminine), or Chernomorskoye (neuter) is the name of several places in Ukraine and inhabited localities in Russia.

Urban localities
Chernomorsky, Seversky District, Krasnodar Krai, an urban-type settlement under the administrative jurisdiction of Chernomorsky Settlement Okrug in Seversky District of Krasnodar Krai; 
Chornomorske, an urban-type settlement in Crimea (Chernomorsky District of the Republic of Crimea) in Ukraine

Rural localities
Chernomorsky, Krymsky District, Krasnodar Krai, a khutor in Yuzhny Rural Okrug of Krymsky District in Krasnodar Krai; 
Chernomorsky, Saratov Oblast, a settlement in Voskresensky District of Saratov Oblast
Chernomorskaya, a stanitsa in Chernomorsky Rural Okrug under the administrative jurisdiction of the City of Goryachy Klyuch in Krasnodar Krai;

Notes